Bannatyne is a Scottish surname. It is also spelt Ballentine, Ballantyne, Ballantine, among others. It may refer to:

People 
Bannatyne (name)

Title 
 Iain Peebles, Lord Bannatyne
 William Bannatyne, Lord Bannatyne

Places 
 Bannatyne, Christ Church, Barbados, populated place
 Bannatyne Cove, Newfoundland and Labrador, Canadian hamlet
 Port Bannatyne, Scottish village

Others 
 Bannatyne Club, founded by Walter Scott, in memory of George Bannatyne
 Bannatyne Manuscript, collected by George Bannatyne
 Bannatyne manuscript (Clan MacLeod)
 Bannatyne's, a line of UK health clubs
 So Long, Bannatyne, an album by The Guess Who
 Bannatyne v Overtoun, a 1904 Scottish legal case
 Clan Bannatyne, see List of Scottish clans

See also 
 Ballantine (surname)
 Ballantyne
 Ballentine (disambiguation)